Dajiao, called the Taiping Qingjiao or Taai ping ching jiu in Hong Kong, is a Taoist ritual and festival which is performed every year.

The ritual is to pray and request the Taoist Deities to bestow peace and harmony in the particular neighborhood or location. Pak Tai is the most popular Chinese Deity for this religious service and rituals. Believers have to abstain from meat and eat vegetarian food at the festival. It is performed across Greater China: Sichuan, Fujian, Taiwan, Guangdong and Hong Kong.

Hong Kong
The festival name is transliterated as Tai Ping Ching Chiu from Cantonese. Some of these festivals are called Da Jiu Festival, a famous one of which is the Cheung Chau Bun Festival. This festival is also practiced in Hong Kong in Sheung Shui Wai, New Territories, Yuen Long and Kam Sheung Road.

References

Further reading

External links

 thaiworldview.com - Tai Ping Ching Chiu

Taoist festivals
Festivals in Hong Kong
Religion in Hong Kong